Cassidy R. Sugimoto is an American information scientist who is the Professor and Tom and Marie Patton School Chair in the School of Public Policy at the Georgia Institute of Technology. She studies the ways knowledge is processed and disseminated. She is the author of the 2016 MIT Press book Big Data is Not a Monolith.

Early life and education 
Sugimoto was an undergraduate student at University of North Carolina at Chapel Hill, where she studied music performance. She remained at the University for graduate studies, but moved to the department of Library Science. Her doctoral research considered the scholarly development of information and library science. She evaluated mentoring, collaboration and interdisciplinary training in doctoral education.

Research and career 
After earning her doctorate, Sugimoto joined the faculty at the Indiana University Bloomington. From 2018 to 2020 Sugimoto worked as program director for the National Science Foundation program on Science of Science and Innovation Policy. Sugimoto was appointed Professor of Informatics at Indiana University in 2020. She moved to the Georgia Institute of Technology in 2021. Her research considers the formal and informal production, sharing and consumption of knowledge. She was announced as a member of the Angewandte Chemie International Advisory board.

Awards and honors
 2002 University of North Carolina at Chapel Hill Concerto Competition Winner
 2009 Association for Information Science and Technology James M. Cretsos Leadership Award
 2014 Indiana University Trustees Excellence in Teaching Award
 2014 Committee on Institutional Cooperation Academic Leadership Program Fellow
 2020 Indiana University Bicentennial Award for service

Selected publications

Books

References 

Living people
University of North Carolina at Chapel Hill alumni
Georgia Tech faculty
Indiana University Bloomington faculty
Year of birth missing (living people)